Lila or leela can be loosely translated as "divine play". The concept of lila is common to both non-dualist and dualist philosophical schools of Indian philosophy, but has a markedly different significance in each. Within non-dualism, lila is a way of describing all reality, including the cosmos, as the outcome of creative play by the divine absolute (Brahman). In the dualistic schools of Vaishnavism, lila refers to the activities of God and his devotee, as well as the macrocosmic actions of the manifest universe, as seen in the Vaishnava scripture Srimad Bhagavatam, verse 3.26.4:

sa eṣa prakṛtiḿ sūkṣmāḿ daivīḿ guṇamayīḿ vibhuḥ yadṛcchayaivopagatām abhyapadyata līlayā"As his pastimes, that Supreme Divine Personality, the greatest of the great, accepted the subtle material energy which is invested with three material modes of nature."

Modern interpretations

Implications
Hindu denominations differ on how a human should react to awareness of lila. Karma Yoga allows a joyful embrace of all aspects of life ("intentional acceptance") while maintaining distinction from the Supreme, while Bhakti and Jnana Yoga advocate striving for oneness with the Supreme. Lila is an important idea in the traditional worship of Krishna (as prankster) and Shiva (as dancer), and has been used by modern writers like Stephen Nachmanovitch, Fritjof Capra, and Alan Watts.

Lila is comparable to the Western theological position of Pandeism, which describes the Universe as God taking a physical form in order to experience the interplay between the elements of the Universe.

See also
 Avatar
 Ludus amoris, western mystical conception of divine play
 The Mysterious Pastimes of Mohini Murti
 Radha Ramana
 Ramlila
 Rasa lila
 Trimurti (Brahma, Vishnu, Shiva)

References

Further reading
 Philosophies of India, Heinrich Zimmer and Joseph Campbell, Princeton University Press, 1969.
 The Integral Advaitism of Sri Aurobindo, Ram Shanker Misra, Motilal Banarsidass Publishers Pvt Ltd, Delhi, 1998.
 The Domain of Constant Excess: Plural Worship at the Munnesvaram Temples in Sri Lanka, Rohan Bastin, Berghahn Books, 2002.
 Purifying the Earthly Body of God: Religion and Ecology in Hindu Indi, Lance E. Nelson, State University of New York Press, 1998.
 The Gods at Play: Lila in South Asia, William Sturman Sax, ed., Oxford University Press, 1995, .
 "Playing", Richard Schechner, Play & Culture, 1988, Vol. 1, pp. 3–19.
 The Gods at Play: Lila in South Asia, David Mason, Palgrave Macmillan, 2009.

External links
 Maha Lilah : Portuguese version of Gyan Chaupad
 A Here-Now glossary entry
 Shirdi Sai Baba Lila

Hindu philosophical concepts
Reality
Play (activity)